"Here I Go Again" is a song by American singer Mario. It was released as the third single from his second studio album, Turning Point, in June 2005. The song was produced by Drama Family Ent. and Ron "Neff-U" Feemster. The single debuted on the UK Singles Chart at number 11 and also reached the top 20 in Australia and Ireland. The official remix of the song produced by Blacksmith and another remix was produced by Mauve.

Critical reception
From Contactmusic.com, there are two different reviews, one from Candice Finney that states: "This track is so funky and so much better than his first outing with "Let me love you" [...] What I love about this song is that it kicks ass, its pure R&B and he's certainly a superstar when it comes to writing about his feelings." The other is from JAZZILY, who rated the single three out of five stars, saying "'Here I Go Again' dynamic co-mingling of R&B with the edginess of pop rock, largely thanks to the sample from "Grease". Mario's voice beautifully overpowers the songs subtle, yet harsh guitar sound making it an exciting diverse sound".

Music video
The video was directed by Ray Kay, Costumed designed by June Ambrose and starred model and R&B singer Cassie, the choreography was made by YA Boy Flash. On the week of, April 7, 2005, the music video premiered on MTV. Mario alternately confronts and romances a sexy woman in "Here I Go Again." The couple's tumultuous relationship plays out in such locations as the streets of New York City, on a rooftop, in a taxi and on a watery stage in front of a truck. Also included are a few choreographed dance set-ups.

Track listings

Australian CD single
 "Here I Go Again"
 "Here I Go Again" (Blacksmith Rerub with rap)
 "Here I Go Again" (Blacksmith Rerub without rap)
 "Here I Go Again" (Mauve mix)
 "Let Me Love You" (Mauve mix)

European CD single
 "Here I Go Again" – 3:21
 "Here I Go Again" (Mauve vocal) – 7:47

European maxi-CD single
 "Here I Go Again" (album version)
 "Here I Go Again" (AOL live version)
 "Here I Go Again" (Mauve remix)
 "Here I Go Again" (video)

UK CD single
 "Here I Go Again" (original version)
 "Here I Go Again" (Blacksmith Rerub featuring the Bosses Players edit)

UK 12-inch single
A1. "Here I Go Again" (Blacksmith Rerub featuring the Bosses Players)
A2. "Here I Go Again" (Blacksmith instrumental)
A3. "Here I Go Again" (original version)
B1. "Here I Go Again" (Mauve remix)
B2. "Here I Go Again" (Mauve remix dub)

Charts

Release history

References

2004 songs
2005 singles
J Records singles
Mario (singer) songs
Music videos directed by Ray Kay
Song recordings produced by Theron Feemster
Songs written by Theron Feemster
Torch songs